Hindu Makkal Katchi (HMK), literally meaning Hindu People's Party, also pronounced as Indu Makkal Katchi (IMK), is a right-wing, Hindu nationalist party in the Indian state of Tamil Nadu.

The organisation was set up by Rashtriya Swayamsevak Sangh (RSS) as a front for its political activities in Tamil Nadu. Since its formation served as the platform for RSS and its subsidiaries known as the Sangh Parivar.

Formation
Hindu Munnani, the parent organization of Hindu Makkal Katchi was set up by Rashtriya Swayamsevak Sangh (RSS) as a front for its political and communal activities in Tamil Nadu. Tamil Nadu was free from the political influence of RSS, which was trying to influence the state since the early 1980s. Hindu Munnani org was founded in 1980 by Rama Gopalan, a member of R.S.S. and since its formation served as the platform for RSS and its subsidiaries known as the Sangh Parivar.

The organisation promoted a Hindu communal identity and used it as a political mobilisation strategy. In the early 1990s, the AIADMK Jayalalitha government (1991–1996) tilted towards Hindutva,in reaction to the vote-bank politics of DMK. Jayalalitha-led government supported the activities of Hindu Munnani in organizing Vinayaka Chathurthi processions in major cities of Tamil Nadu. The state government's support of Rama Gopalan's activity made him a follower of Jayalalitha. Due to this proximity, a faction of Hindu Munnani broke away and found another group named Hindu Makkal Katchi under the leadership of S.V. Sridhar in 1993. The militants of the two groups used vituperative and abusive language against the Muslims. The provocative speeches against Islam and Prophet Muhammad polarized the social atmosphere of the region. Their anti-Muslim speeches and activities led to formation of Muslim group Al Umma.

The activities of RSS, Hindu Munnani and Hindu Makkal Katchi continued uninterrupted under Jayalalitha. The BJP alliance with AIADMK led to further spread of RSS ideology in Tamil Nadu. These organisations used religious festivals to combine their strength and caused riots.

Activities 
Due to various extremist actions the party got repeatedly in conflict with the law. Its leader Arjun Sampath was arrested in 1997 on an attempted murder charge.
 
Hindu Makkal Katchi staged demonstrations on 29 October 2017 in front of theatres across Tamil Nadu in protest against freedom of speech i.e. 'objectionable sentences' about Goods and Services Tax in actor Vijay's 'Mersal'. HMK leader Arjun Sampath led a demonstration in front of a theatre in Kumbakonam and demanded removal of the 'controversial sentences'. Party activists tore up banners of Vijay and movie director Atlee. In Tiruchirapalli, HMK members staged a demonstration in front of a theatre, while similar protests were held at Ottenchathram in Dindigul and in Chennai. The movie ran into trouble soon after its 18 October 2017 release, coinciding with Diwali, over 'incorrect references' to the GST.

In 2008 and 2009 party members got temporarily arrested by the police to block them from staging nationalistic demonstrations on the island of Kachchatheevu, which belongs to Sri Lanka.

In 2009, Tamil fishermen got arrested by Sri Lankan Navy. To protect them, HMK supporters started agitations and pressurized Indian Govt to take responsibility of them and rescue them from Sri Lanka. When former Union Home Minister P. Chidambaram visited Tamil Nadu, HMK supporters showed black flag as central govt failed to rescue Tamil fisherman from Sri Lankan navy. 19 supporters got arrested and removed from Gandhi park area by police. Not only Sri Lanka issue they also sought about handling problems in bilateral relations with Pakistan and China.

The party also made repeatedly headlines with peaceful charges against women. It pressed charges against the movie stars Khushbu (2006), Shriya Saran (2008) and Mallika Sherawat (2008) for "indecent dressing" and "offending Hindu values". Party members also harassed women visiting pubs and young couples being out on Valentine's Day.

The Party's president Arjun Sampath claimed that 1000 Dalit Christians will be reconverted to Hinduism at Tirunelveli which gains significance in the backdrop 9 March police shootout in which two people were killed when clashes broke out between the members of upper caste Catholics and Dalit Catholics.

The party's five activists were arrested for indulging in demolition of Periyar E. V. Ramasamy's statue installed in front of the Rajagopuram of the Sri Ranganathaswamy Temple in Srirangam.

In 2017, Hindu Makkal Katchi leader strongly opposed the Indian Prime Minister Narendra Modi's second time visit to Sri Lanka next month, where he was going to participate in the United Nations Vesak Celebrations which was held from 12 to 14 May 2017. This 'International Day of Vesak' was hosted by the Buddhist-majority country and the commemorations in Colombo was also include an International Buddhist Conference in which over 400 delegates from more than 100 countries.

In November 2019, Hindu Makkal Katchi leader Arjun Sampath was detained following his draping of saffron shawl on Thiruvalluvar statue in Pillayarpatti, Thanjavur. This is read as an attempt at saffronization of Thiruvalluvar.

They were instrumental in bringing back Lakshmi, the temple elephant at Manakula Vinayagar Temple in Puduchery. Lakshmi was taken away by PETA and the Animal Welfare Board and accused the Temple of violating the Prevention of Cruelty to animals and the Wildlife Protection Act, 1972. She was relocated to Krishi Vigyan Kendra at Kurumamber, where her health was reported to have deteriorated.

References

Political parties in Tamil Nadu
Indian Hindu political parties
1993 establishments in Tamil Nadu
Political parties established in 1993